WNLO (channel 23) is a television station in Buffalo, New York, United States, airing programming from The CW. It is owned and operated by network majority owner Nexstar Media Group alongside CBS affiliate WIVB-TV (channel 4). WNLO and WIVB-TV share studios on Elmwood Avenue in North Buffalo; through a channel sharing agreement, the two stations transmit using WNLO's spectrum from a tower in Colden, New York.

History

As a PBS member station (1987–2001)
The station signed on the air as WNEQ-TV on May 13, 1987, and was the second public television outlet serving the Buffalo market. It was operated under an educational license and was sister station to WNED-TV (channel 17), which had a commercial license but operated as an educational station (WNED-TV operated on channel 17 because of the donation of equipment to it by WBUF-TV, a defunct commercial station). The analog UHF channel 23 allocation was originally intended to be part of a plan for a statewide public television network (the concept of which would much later become ThinkBright) that would have seen a signature tower housing transmitters for channel 23 as well as WBFO (88.7 FM) on the University at Buffalo's Amherst Campus. Studios were to be located there as well during development of the futuristic "New U.B." complex in the 1970s. Budget constraints curbed the plan and years of tension between the university and WNED-TV board members ended allowing the station to go forward with its plans for the UHF channel.

WNEQ-TV's broadcast day began daily at 4 p.m. and it usually aired between six and seven hours of programming per day. In 1992, many cable providers in Hamilton and Niagara began carrying WNEQ-TV, displacing long-standing WQLN from Erie, Pennsylvania, in the process. In fall 1998, most of the cable providers in those regions started to remove WNEQ as they were struggling with limited channel capacity and because it had a limited daily program schedule. One year later, Rogers Cable began carrying WNEQ on its digital tier for customers in the Greater Toronto Area.

The Buffalo market was unable to support two public stations, and both WNEQ-TV and WNED-TV struggled financially. As a result, the educational foundation put WNEQ-TV up for sale. LIN TV (owner of CBS affiliate WIVB-TV) wanted to buy WNEQ-TV and run it as a commercial station. However, that was problematic because WNEQ-TV was operating under an educational license. One solution was for LIN to instead purchase WNED-TV (which already had a commercial license), resulting in WNEQ-TV becoming the area's primary PBS station. This solution was also rejected, since UHF channel 17 had long been established as a PBS station and a move to channel 23 might cause confusion among viewers, potentially reducing the amount of donations that the viewer-supported station would receive.

In 2000, the Federal Communications Commission (FCC) agreed to reassign channel 23 to a commercial license and assigned channel 17 an educational license. Consequently, the Buffalo market retained an educational-licensed station and LIN TV was permitted to purchase the converted-to-commercial WNEQ-TV.

As a commercial station (2001–present)
In March 2001, LIN closed on its purchase of WNEQ-TV and converted it to a general entertainment independent station under the call sign WNLO, though it would not merge its transmitter facilities with new sister station WIVB until 2019, instead continuing to transmit from the WNED tower. In 2003, WNLO secured the UPN affiliation for the Buffalo market when the network's affiliation agreement with the weaker-rated WNGS (channel 67, now WBBZ-TV) expired. On cable in Toronto, WNLO was replaced with WTVS from Detroit in January 2001 when it relaunched as a commercial station. In 2005, Rogers submitted a successful request to the Canadian Radio-television and Telecommunications Commission (CRTC) to allow carriage of WNLO in Ontario. The station would not compete on advertising revenue from the Toronto area (as Rogers suggested with another Buffalo station it carried, WNYO-TV) and the signal was also available over-the-air in a good portion of the Golden Horseshoe of Southern Ontario.

On January 24, 2006, CBS Corporation and Time Warner announced the shutdown of both UPN and The WB effective that fall. In place of these two networks, a new "fifth" network—"The CW" (its name representing the first initials of parent companies CBS and Warner), jointly owned by both companies, would launch, with a lineup primarily featuring the most popular programs from both networks. On February 22, News Corporation announced it would start up another new network called MyNetworkTV. This new service, which would be a sister network to Fox, would be operated by Fox Television Stations and its syndication division Twentieth Television. MyNetworkTV was created in order to give UPN and WB stations that were not mentioned as becoming CW affiliates another option besides becoming an independent station, as well as to compete against The CW. In April, WNLO removed the UPN branding from its station logo following the lead of News Corporation's UPN affiliates. MyNetworkTV launched on September 5 on Sinclair Broadcast Group-owned WNYO-TV (channel 49), while WNLO became part of The CW upon its launch on September 18, 2006.

On November 2 of that year, WNLO began broadcasting CW network programming in high definition on its digital signal. Until this point, it was rebroadcasting WIVB-TV's high definition feed, because UPN had little to no HD programming to broadcast. On May 18, 2007, LIN TV announced the company was exploring strategic alternatives that could have resulted in its sale. In early July 2007, WNLO launched its own website; previously, the station's web page was merely a separate section within WIVB-TV's website.

On March 10, 2010, the station acquired a universal cable channel slot on Time Warner Cable systems throughout Western New York after years of being on different channels throughout the provider's service area. The station moved to channel 11 because Time Warner Cable ended a reserve for former channel 11 slot holder WNGS, which had been off the air for several months. Most cable providers had previously placed WNLO on channel 9, which had to be cleared for the move of TWC's in-house cable-only news channel YNN Buffalo from cable channel 14, which had not been available to all of its subscribers.

On March 21, 2014, it was announced that Media General would acquire LIN. The merger was completed on December 19, bringing WIVB-TV and WNLO under common ownership with ABC affiliate WTEN and under the same management as Fox affiliate WXXA-TV, both in Albany.

On January 27, 2016, Media General announced that it had entered into a definite agreement to be acquired by Nexstar Broadcasting Group. The combined company is now known as "Nexstar Media Group," and owns 171 stations (including WIVB and WNLO).

Programming
WNLO can be considered an alternate CBS affiliate as it simulcasts the CBS Overnight News and the CBS Morning News from WIVB-TV. The station is also responsible for airing CBS programs when WIVB-TV is unable or otherwise chooses not to air a program due to local or syndicated programming commitments. Syndicated programming on WNLO as of September 2020 includes The Good Dish, The Real, Tamron Hall, The Drew Barrymore Show, and The Wendy Williams Show among others.

In 2015, WNLO acquired Raycom Sports's ACC Network package of college football and men's basketball broadcasts from the Atlantic Coast Conference. The ACC package had previously aired on WBBZ-TV for the previous two seasons.

In April 2019, WNLO announced the acquisition of a package of Buffalo Bisons Minor League Baseball games, mostly on Saturday nights, once approximately every two weeks.

Newscasts

After WIVB-TV took over operations of WNLO in March 2001, the CBS affiliate began producing a nightly half-hour prime time newscast on channel 23. Known as The 10 O'Clock News, it competed with another newscast in the timeslot on Pax affiliate WPXJ-TV that was produced by NBC affiliate WGRZ (channel 2; it was eventually dropped in 2003). On April 20, 2006, WGRZ started producing a half-hour prime time newscast for The WB (now MyNetworkTV) affiliate WNYO-TV (WNYO-TV briefly had its own News Central-based newscast from 2005 to 2006). In order to gain more viewers than WNLO, the second WGRZ 10 p.m. newscast originally featured ten minutes of news and weather, with the rest of the half-hour dedicated to sports. However, due to low ratings, the sports segment was reduced to a traditional segment seen after weather.

WNLO consistently led WNYO-TV in the ratings, for a number of reasons. By May 2011, it was the highest-rated late newscast (10 or 11 p.m.) in all of Western New York among viewers 18 to 54, beating all of the market's 11 p.m. newscasts; among total viewers, it trails WGRZ and sister station WIVB-TV. On February 2, 2009, WNLO began airing a two-hour extension of WIVB-TV's weekday morning newscast. Known as Wake Up! on CW 23, it aired from 7 to 9 a.m., and competed against WIVB-TV's broadcast of The Early Show. The station airs its own locally produced morning talk show, Winging It! Buffalo Style during the 8 a.m. hour, which upon its debut, reduced WNLO's Wake Up! newscast to one hour. The station also rebroadcasts WIVB-TV's hour-long weekend morning newscast, Weekend Wake Up!, from noon to 1 p.m., and simulcasts that station's hour-long 6 p.m. newscast on Sunday nights.

On February 1, 2012, WIVB-TV became the third and last television station in the Buffalo market to begin broadcasting its local newscasts in high definition; the newscasts that WIVB-TV produces for WNLO were included in the upgrade. On January 6, 2014, WIVB-TV expanded the 10:00 weeknight newscast on WNLO to one hour (the move was originally planned to maintain a lead-in for The Arsenio Hall Show, which the station had planned to air at 10:30 but could not get the syndicator to distribute until 11:00; that show would be canceled in May, while the newscast remains at its full length). The newscast remains a half-hour on weekends. In either 2013 or 2014, the WNLO portion of Wake-Up! expanded to 2 hours, once again from 7:00–9:00 a.m., moving Winging It! Buffalo Style to 9:00 a.m.; Winging It! Buffalo Style was canceled effective January 2015.

In December 2017, WIVB announced that it would begin producing a half-hour early evening newscast at 6:30 p.m. for WNLO which premiered on January 15, 2018, serving as a local alternative to the national network evening news programs seen on WGRZ, WKBW-TV and WIVB.

Technical information

Subchannels 
The station's digital signal is multiplexed:

In June 2013, WNLO announced it would begin carrying Bounce TV, an African American-oriented television network, on its second digital subchannel; the network began to be carried on channel 23.2 on July 1.

Analog-to-digital conversion
WNLO discontinued regular programming on its analog signal, over UHF channel 23, at 9 a.m. on June 12, 2009, the official date in which full-power television stations in the United States transitioned from analog to digital broadcasts under federal mandate. The station's digital signal remained on its pre-transition UHF channel 32. Through the use of PSIP, digital television receivers display the station's virtual channel as its former UHF analog channel 23. The UHF channel 23 allotment formerly allocated to WNLO for its analog signal is now used for the digital signal of Ion Television owned-and-operated station WPXJ-TV (virtual channel 51).

WIVB began to share WNLO's physical channel in summer 2018 after Nexstar sold WIVB's existing spectrum in the FCC transition auction, moving to the WNLO/WNED tower temporarily. In the summer of 2019, WNLO/WIVB shifted to its post-transition channel, and began to transmit from the WIVB-TV Tower in Colden, and merged the two stations' operations fully together, including physical transmitter.

Carriage disputes
In October 2008, LIN TV broke off all retransmission deals with Time Warner Cable. LIN TV was demanding a fee of 25 cents per month per subscriber to carry each of its stations as it is entitled to under federal must carry regulations. TWC had initially refused to accept these fees and, on October 2, WNLO and sister station WIVB-TV were removed from the provider's lineups. LIN TV and TWC reached an agreement for the two stations and each were returned to the cable provider's lineup on October 30. As part of the agreement, WNLO's high definition signal began to be carried on TWC's digital tier for the first time. Another retransmission consent dispute threatened to take WIVB-TV and WNLO off Dish Network lineups in March 2011.

WNLO is not available in portions of Cattaraugus County that are served by Atlantic Broadband, where WSEE-DT2 out of Erie, Pennsylvania is used as a less expensive alternative.

References

External links

The CW affiliates
Rewind TV affiliates
Television channels and stations established in 1987
NLO
Nexstar Media Group
1987 establishments in New York (state)